The Hastings Center is an independent, nonpartisan bioethics research institute and think tank based in Garrison, New York. It was instrumental in establishing the field of bioethics and is among the most prestigious bioethics and health policy institutes in the world.

Its mission is to address ethical issues in health care, science, and technology. Through its projects and publications, the center aims to influence the ideas of health policy-makers, regulators, health care professionals, lawyers, journalists, and students.

The center is funded by grants, private donations and journal subscriptions.

Founding
The Hastings Center was founded in 1969 by Daniel Callahan and Willard Gaylin, originally as the Institute of Society, Ethics, and the Life Sciences. It was first located in Hastings-on-Hudson, New York, and is now in Garrison, New York, on the former Woodlawn estate designed by Richard Upjohn.

In the early years, the center identified four core issues as its domain: population control, including respect for procreative freedom; behavior control, which responded to early discoveries about the brain-behavior link and efforts to find ways to modify behaviors and prompted reassessment of what is "normal"; death and dying, including the ongoing controversy over defining death; and ethical issues in human genetics. The Hastings Center continues to work on these issues and has expanded to other areas, including the human impact on nature, governance of emerging technologies such as CRISPR gene editing, and wise and compassionate health care.

Publications
The Hastings Center publishes two journals, the Hastings Center Report, and Ethics & Human Research (formerly IRB: Ethics & Human Research). Each journal is published six times per year. Hastings Center Report, founded in 1970, features scholarship and commentary in bioethics. It also periodically features special reports, published as supplements, many of which grow out of the center's research projects. Ethics & Human Research aims to foster critical analysis of issues in science and health care that have implications for human biomedical and behavioral research.

Hastings Bioethics Forum blog publishes individual perspectives on current issues in bioethics.

Bioethics Briefings is a free online Hastings Center resource for students, journalists, and policymakers on bioethics issues of high public interest, such as abortion, brain injury, organ transplantation, physician-assisted death, and stem cell research. The chapters are written by leading ethicists and are nonpartisan, describing topics from a range of perspectives that are grounded in scientific facts.

Research
The Hastings Center's projects, many of which are carried out by interdisciplinary research teams, focus on five program areas: health and health care; children and families; aging, chronic conditions and end of life; science and the self; humans and nature.

Research projects consist of seminar-style meetings that bring together people with diverse views and expertise to address issues that pose dilemmas and challenges to society. Recent projects include Goals and Practices for Next-Generation Prenatal Genetic Testing; The Last Stage of Life, a planning process to determine how best to meet the new and complex needs of our aging society; Public Deliberation on Gene Editing in the Wild; Actionable Ethics Oversight of Human-Animal Chimera Research; and ongoing work on immigrant health. Hastings Center research strives to frame and explore issues that inform professional practice, public conversation, and policy.

The Robert S. Morison Library, located at the center's offices in Garrison, New York, serves as a resource for Hastings' scholars, fellows and visitors.

Influence
The Hastings Center is recognized as having established bioethics as a field of study.

The Hastings Center's 1987 "Guidelines on the Termination of Life-Sustaining Treatment and the Care of the Dying" was foundational in setting the ethical and legal framework for U.S. medical decision-making. It was cited in the 1990 Supreme Court ruling in Cruzan v. Director, Missouri Department of Health, which established patients' constitutional right to refuse life-sustaining treatment and affirmed that surrogates could make decisions for patients lacking that capacity. An updated, expanded edition, The Hastings Center Guidelines for Decisions on Life-Sustaining Treatment and Care Near the End of Life, was published in 2013.

Recommendations from The Hastings Center's Undocumented Patients project in partnership with the New York Immigration Coalition  informed New York City Mayor Bill de Blasio's announcement in January 2019 that New York City would guarantee comprehensive health care for all New Yorkers, regardless of immigration status.

Hastings Center research scholars are frequently called upon for policy advice by committees and agencies at both the federal and state levels. Recent examples include The National Academies of Sciences, Engineering, and Medicine's Gene Drives on the Horizon report, which was produced by a committee that included Hastings Center research scholar Gregory Kaebnick, and the National Academies Physician-Assisted Death workshop, whose planning committee included Hastings research scholar Nancy Berlinger.

Notable fellows, past and present
Hastings Center fellows are elected for their contributions to informing scholarship or public understanding of the complex ethical issues in health, health care, and life sciences research.
 Eli Y. Adashi, former Dean of Medicine and Biological Sciences at Brown University.
 Anita L. Allen, Henry R. Silverman Professor of Law and professor of philosophy at the University of Pennsylvania Law School.
 George Annas, Warren Distinguished Professor and Director of the Center for Health Law, Ethics & Human Rights at the Boston University School School of Medicine.
 Dan W. Brock, Lee Professor Emeritus of Medical Ethics at Harvard Medical School, the former Director of the Center for Bioethics at Harvard Medical School.
 Arthur Caplan, Mitty Professor of Bioethics at New York University Langone Medical Center.
 Ezekiel Emanuel, Chair of the Department of Medical Ethics and Health Policy at the University of Pennsylvania, founding chair of the Department of Bioethics of the National Institutes of Health.
 Atul Gawande, Pioneering public health researcher, CEO of Haven Healthcare, and Thier Professor of Surgery at Harvard Medical School.
 Amy Gutmann, eighth president of the University of Pennsylvania, former chair of the Presidential Commission for the Study of Bioethical Issues under President Barack Obama.
 Patricia A. King, Professor of Law emeritus at Georgetown University Law Center and an Adjunct Professor in the School of Hygiene and Public Health at Johns Hopkins University.
 Jonathan D. Moreno, U.S. member of the UNESCO International Bioethics Committee, David and Lyn Silfen University Professor and Professor of Medical Ethics at the University of Pennsylvania.
 Robert Truog, Frances Glessner Lee Professor of Medical Ethics, Anaesthesiology & Pediatrics and Director of the Center for Bioethics at Harvard Medical School.

Awards
Henry Knowles Beecher Award

Since 1976, The Hastings Center's Henry Knowles Beecher Award  has recognized people who have made a lifetime contribution to ethics and life sciences. A committee of Hastings Center Fellows convenes to nominate candidates for the award, which is named for its inaugural recipient Henry K. Beecher.

The Hastings Center Cunniff-Dixon Physician Awards

The Hastings Center and the Cunniff-Dixon Foundation established The Hastings Center Cunniff-Dixon Physician Awards, which recognize doctors who give exemplary care to patients nearing the end of life.

References

External links
 

1969 establishments in New York (state)
Ethics organizations
Non-profit organizations based in New York (state)
Bioethics research organizations
Publishing companies of the United States
Putnam County, New York
Think tanks based in the United States
Think tanks established in 1969